

Plants

Cnidarians

Arthropods

Bryozoans

Brachiopods

Molluscs

Echinoderms

Conodonts

Fishes

Amphibians

Research
 A study of the anatomy of the skull of Acanthostega gunnari is published by Porro, Rayfield & Clack (2015).
 A study of the skeletal morphogenesis of the lepospondyls Microbrachis pelikani and Hyloplesion longicostatum is published by Olori (2015).
 A study of the anatomy of the skull of the lepospondyl Quasicaecilia texana is published by Pardo, Szostakiwskyj & Anderson (2015).

New taxa

Temnospondyls

Lepospondyls

Lissamphibians

Diadectomorphs

Ichthyosauromorphs

Research
 A study of phylogenetic relationships of ichthyopterygians is published by Ji et al. (2015); the authors introduced a new name, Grippioidea, for the clade containing the last common ancestor of Utatsusaurus hataii and Grippia longirostris, and all its descendants.
 An exceptionally large ichthyosaur radius, possibly belonging to a member of Shastasauridae (which, if confirmed, would indicate that members of the family survived until Early Jurassic) is described from the Hettangian Blue Lias Formation (south Wales, United Kingdom) by Martin et al. (2015).

New taxa

Sauropterygians

Research
 A study on the growth patterns and strategies of placodonts is published by Klein et al. (2015).
 A study on the sexual selection and dimorphism in Keichousaurus hui is published by Motani et al. (2015). 
 A study on the teeth replacement patterns during the ontogeny in pliosaurids is published by Sassoon, Foffa & Marek (2015).

New taxa

Lepidosaurs

Research
 A phylogenetic analysis of living and fossil squamate relationships, based on morphological and molecular data, is published by Reeder et al. (2015).
 Miocene anoles from the Dominican amber, showing the habitat specializations also present in the extant Caribbean anoles, are described by Sherratt et al. (2015).

New taxa

Rhynchocephalians

Lizards

Snakes

Turtles

Archosauriformes

Pseudosuchians

Research
 Revision of the type material of Rauisuchus tiradentes is published by Lautenschlager and Rauhut (2015).
 A study on the changes in the morphology of vertebrae caused by increased adaptation to aquatic locomotion in the evolution of crocodylomorphs is published by Molnar et al. (2015).
 A study of the evolutionary history of the clade Crocodyliformes is published by Bronzati, Montefeltro and Langer (2015).
 A study of impact of the climate changes on the evolution and biodiversity of pseudosuchian archosaurs is published by Mannion et al. (2015).
 A study on the phylogenetic position of thalattosuchians within Crocodylomorpha is published by Wilberg (2015).
 A review of the diagnostic features of the species assigned to the genus Machimosaurus is published by Martin, Vincent & Falconnet (2015).
 An isolated metriorhynchid tooth is described from the Early Cretaceous (Aptian) Hybla Formation (Sicily, Italy) by Chiarenza et al. (2015), extending the known geological range of Metriorhynchidae and Thalattosuchia by approximately 7–8 million years; Fischer et al. (2015) subsequently caution that it might potentially be a pliosaurid tooth instead.

New taxa

Non-avian dinosaurs

Research
 A study of phylogenetic relationships of sauropod dinosaurs belonging to the family Diplodocidae and the taxonomic revision of the family is published by Tschopp, Mateus and Benson (2015); the authors propose to reestablish Brontosaurus as a genus distinct from Apatosaurus and to transfer Dinheirosaurus lourinhanensis to the genus Supersaurus.
 Additional information on the anatomy of the holotype specimen of the rebbachisaurid sauropod Tataouinea hannibalis, including description of newly discovered fossil material of this specimen, and study of its phylogenetic relationships is published by Fanti et al. (2015).
 A reevaluation of the estimated body mass of Dreadnoughtus schrani is published by Bates et al. (2015).
 A study of phylogenetic relationships of ornithischian dinosaurs traditionally referred to as ‘basal ornithopods’ or ‘hypsilophodontids’ is published by Boyd (2015).
 Carpenter & Lamanna (2015) reinterpret the ornithopod braincase from the Morrison Formation of the Carnegie Quarry at Dinosaur National Monument (Utah), formerly assigned to Uteodon aphanoecetes, as actually belonging to Dryosaurus cf. D. altus. The authors consider genera Uteodon and Cumnoria to be junior synonyms of Camptosaurus, and transfer the species Cumnoria prestwichii and Uteodon aphanoecetes to the genus Camptosaurus.

New taxa

Birds

Research
 Balaur bondoc, originally interpreted as a member of Dromaeosauridae, is argued to be a basal member of Avialae by Cau, Brougham and Naish (2015).
 Estimates of likely mass and flight capability of the extinct Chatham duck (Anas chathamica), as indicated by measurements of major bones, are published by Williams (2015).
 New cranial material of the Oligo-Miocene relative of flamingos, Harrisonavis croizeti, is described by Torres et al. (2015).
 New specimens of the Eocene relative of swifts, Scaniacypselus szarskii, are described by Mayr (2015).
 A specimen of a stem-coliiform Masillacolius brevidactylus with preserved skull is described by Mayr (2015).
 A study of the phylogenetic relationships of Psittacopes, Pumiliornis and Morsoravis, indicating their close relationship to the passerines and extinct family Zygodactylidae, is published by Mayr (2015); the author also introduced a new name, Parapasseres, for the clade containing Passeriformes and Zygodactylidae but not Psittacopes.
 A study of preserved specimens of the Puerto Rican conure (previously considered to be an extinct subspecies of the Hispaniolan parakeet) is published by Olson (2015), who raises it to the rank of a separate species Psittacara maugei.
 A Dwarf Emu was found in the Miocene of Alcoota in Central Australia.
 Jones et al. (2015) describe a distal end of the left tibiotarsus of a member of the genus Caracara of uncertain specific assignment from the late Pleistocene of Argentina, estimated to be the largest member of the family Falconidae described thus far.
 A description of the skeletal anatomy of two well-preserved specimens of the dodo is published by Claessens, Meijer and Hume (2015).

New taxa

Pterosaurs

Research
 A study on the terrestrial locomotion of non-pterodactyloid pterosaurs is published by Witton (2015).
 A specimen of Rhamphorhynchus muensteri with preserved soft tissues or impressions of soft tissues, stomach contents and possibly a coprolite is described by Hone et al. (2015).
 Eleutério et al. (2015) study the bone microstructure characterization of two pterosaurs belonging to the group Anhangueria.
 The paleoenvironments of azhdarchid pterosaurs from the Late Cretaceous of Kazakhstan are studied by Averianov et al. (2015).
 Martill et al. (2015) describe a jaw bone attributed to the mid-Cretaceous pterosaur species Alanqa saharica from the Kem Kem beds of Morocco.

New taxa

Other
 A study on the archosauriform evolutionary history during the Late Permian and Early Triassic, including description of chirotheriid and chirotheriid-like tracks from the Late Permian of Northern Italy, is published by Bernardi et al. (2015).

Other reptiles

Synapsids

Non-mammalian synapsids

Research
 Redescription of the anatomy of Tiarajudens eccentricus is published by Cisneros et al. (2015), who compare the species with Anomocephalus africanus.

New taxa

Mammals

Other animals

Research
 A study of phylogenetic relationships of the Ediacaran animal Namacalathus, interpreting it as a member of Lophotrochozoa related to bryozoans and brachiopods, is published by Zhuravlev, Wood & Penny (2015).

New taxa

Other organisms

See also
 Dawn of Humanity (2015 PBS film)

References

 
2010s in paleontology
2015 in science